Nationality words link to articles with information on the nation's poetry or literature (for instance, Irish or France).

Events

Works published in English

United Kingdom
 Alfred Austin, The Tower of Babel
 Robert William Dale, The English Hymn Book
 Edward Bulwer-Lytton, Fables in Song
 Arthur O'Shaughnessy, Music and Moonlight
 James Thomson, The City of Dreadful Night, published in the National Reformer, and later in 1880

United States
 Thomas Bailey Aldrich, Cloth of Gold and Other Poems
 William Cullen Bryant, Among the Trees
 Mary Mapes Dodge, Rhymes and Jingles
 Henry Wadsworth Longfellow:
 Editor, Poems of Places, anthology, United States
 The Hanging of the Crane
 Mary Ashley Townsend, The Captain's Story

Works published in other languages

France
 François Coppée, Le Cahier rouge
 Arthur Rimbaud, Illuminations, France
 Comte de Lautréamont, pen name of Isidore Lucien Ducasse, Les Chants de Maldoror, prose poems full of Gothic horror (first published in full this year; originally published in parts in 1868 and 1869); France
 Paul Verlaine, Romances sans paroles, France

Awards and honors

Births
Death years link to the corresponding "[year] in poetry" article:
 January 16 – Robert William Service, "the Bard of the Yukon" (died 1958), Scots-Canadian poet, writer of "The Shooting of Dan McGrew" and "The Cremation of Sam McGee"
 February 3 – Gertrude Stein (died 1946), American writer, poet and catalyst in the development of modern art and literature; spends most of her life in France
 February 9 – Amy Lowell (died 1925), American poet of the imagist school, posthumous winner of the Pulitzer Prize for Poetry in 1926
 February 20 – Gordon Bottomley (died 1948), English poet known particularly for his verse dramas
 February 22 – Kyoshi Takahama 高浜 虚子, pen name of Kiyoshi Takahama (died 1959), Japanese, Shōwa period poet; close disciple of Masaoka Shiki (surname: Takahama)
 March – Stanley de Vere Alexander Julius (died 1930), English military officer and poet
 March 26 – Robert Frost (died 1963), American poet
 April 27 – Maurice Baring (died 1945), English poet, novelist, translator, essayist, travel writer and war correspondent
 May 29 – G. K. Chesterton (died 1936), influential English writer, journalist, poet, biographer, Christian apologist, short story writer and novelist
 May 30 – Josephine Preston Peabody (died 1922), American poet and playwright
 June 20 – Trumbull Stickney (died 1904),  American classical scholar and poet best known for his sonnets
 July 7 – José María Eguren (died 1942), Peruvian symbolist poet
 July 29 – August Stramm (killed in action 1915), German Expressionist poet and playwright
 August 19 – A. H. Reginald Buller (died 1944), British/Canadian mycologist mainly known as a researcher of fungi and wheat rust; also writer of limericks, some of which are published in Punch
 September 8 – Yone Noguchi 野口米次郎 (died 1947), Japanese poet, fiction writer, essayist and literary critic in both English and Japanese; father of the sculptor Isamu Noguchi
 October 6 – Ursula Bethell (died 1945) (New Zealand)
 November 27 – Ridgely Torrence (died 1950), American poet and editor
 November 30 – Lucy Maud Montgomery (died 1942), Canadian author and poet best known for a series of novels beginning with Anne of Green Gables
 Also:
 Kalapi (died 1900), Indian, Gujarati-language poet
 R. H. Long (died 1948), Australian
 J. W. Gordon (Jim Grahame) (died 1949), Australian

Deaths
Birth years link to the corresponding "[year] in poetry" article:
 February 23 – Charles Shirley Brooks, 57 (born 1816), English journalist, novelist and poet
 August 22 – Sydney Thompson Dobell, 50 (born 1824), English poet and critic
 October 5 – Bryan Procter (pen name: Barry Cornwall), 86 (born 1787), English poet

See also

 19th century in poetry
 19th century in literature
 List of years in poetry
 List of years in literature
 Victorian literature
 French literature of the 19th century
 Poetry

Notes

19th-century poetry
Poetry